Lázaro González de Ocampo   was a Spanish sculptor of the 18th century from Tenerife. He is considered one of the island's most noted sculptors.

References

Spanish sculptors
Spanish male sculptors
People from Tenerife
18th-century Spanish people